The 1996–97 NBA season was the Magic's eighth season in the National Basketball Association. After losing Shaquille O'Neal via free agency to the Los Angeles Lakers in the off-season, the Magic acquired Felton Spencer from the Utah Jazz, and signed free agents Gerald Wilkins, Derek Strong, and Danny Schayes. However, after playing just one game for the team, Spencer was then dealt along with Donald Royal and Jon Koncak to the Golden State Warriors in exchange for Rony Seikaly. Early into the season, the Magic played two games against the New Jersey Nets in Tokyo, Japan. After an 8–4 start in November, the Magic struggled losing 10 of their 12 games in December, and held a 24–20 record at the All-Star break. The team lost five straight after the All-Star break, as head coach Brian Hill was fired 49 games into the season, and Penny Hardaway was generally blamed for leading a player revolt that resulted in his dismissal. Hill was replaced with assistant Richie Adubato for the remainder of the season, as the Magic finished third in the Atlantic Division with a 45–37 record.

Hardaway averaged 20.5 points, 5.6 assists and 1.6 steals per game, and was named to the All-NBA Third Team, and was selected for the 1997 NBA All-Star Game, despite only playing 59 games due to knee injuries, while Seikaly averaged 17.3 points, 9.5 rebounds and 1.4 blocks per game, and Horace Grant provided the team with 12.6 points, 9.0 rebounds and 1.5 steals per game. In addition, three-point specialist Dennis Scott contributed 12.5 points per game, and Nick Anderson provided with 12.0 points and 1.9 steals per game, but struggled shooting just .404 in free-throw percentage. Off the bench, Wilkins contributed 10.6 points per game, while Strong averaged 8.5 points and 6.3 rebounds per game, and Brian Shaw provided with 7.2 points and 4.1 assists per game.

The Magic entered the playoffs without Grant, who was out with a wrist injury, and was replaced with Strong as the team's starting power forward. In the Eastern Conference First Round, the Magic faced off against their in-state rivals, the Miami Heat. After losing the first two games on the road to the Heat, the Magic would win the next two games at home to tie the series at 2–2; Hardaway scored 42 points in Game 3, and 41 points in Game 4. However, the Magic lost Game 5 on the road to the Heat, 91–83. As of 2022, this was the only playoff matchup between both teams from Florida.

Following the season, Scott was traded to the Dallas Mavericks after a meltdown about a contract dispute at a basketball camp during the off-season, while Shaw was dealt to the Golden State Warriors, and Adubato was fired as head coach.

Draft picks

Roster

Regular season

Season standings

z – clinched division title
y – clinched division title
x – clinched playoff spot

Record vs. opponents

Game log

Playoffs

|- align="center" bgcolor="#ffcccc"
| 1
| April 24
| @ Miami
| L 64–99
| Derek Strong (15)
| Nick Anderson (12)
| Penny Hardaway (3)
| Miami Arena15,200
| 0–1
|- align="center" bgcolor="#ffcccc"
| 2
| April 27
| @ Miami
| L 87–104
| Penny Hardaway (26)
| Derek Strong (16)
| Brian Shaw (4)
| Miami Arena15,200
| 0–2
|- align="center" bgcolor="#ccffcc"
| 3
| April 29
| Miami
| W 88–75
| Penny Hardaway (42)
| Penny Hardaway (8)
| Darrell Armstrong (8)
| Orlando Arena17,248
| 1–2
|- align="center" bgcolor="#ccffcc"
| 4
| May 1
| Miami
| W 99–91
| Penny Hardaway (41)
| Darrell Armstrong (9)
| Penny Hardaway (4)
| Orlando Arena16,555
| 2–2
|- align="center" bgcolor="#ffcccc"
| 5
| May 4
| @ Miami
| L 83–91
| Penny Hardaway (33)
| Derek Strong (12)
| Penny Hardaway (6)
| Miami Arena15,200
| 2–3
|-

Player statistics

NOTE: Please write the players statistics in alphabetical order by last name.

Season

Playoffs

Awards and honors
 Penny Hardaway – All-NBA Third Team, All-Star

Transactions

References

Orlando Magic seasons
1996 in sports in Florida
1997 in sports in Florida